The 1936 Soviet football championship was the 6th seasons of competitive football in the Soviet Union split into two halves. FC Dynamo Moscow won the championship in spring and FC Spartak Moscow won it in fall. In the fall the defending champions Dynamo were going neck-in-neck with their main rivals Spartak, but just a round away from the finish line they tied with weaker Dynamo Leningrad which costed them the title.

Krasnaya Zaria Leningrad avoided relegation from the Group A in spring, while CDKA Moscow avoided relegation in fall.

Honours

Notes = Number in parentheses is the times that club has won that honour. * indicates new record for competition

Soviet Cup

Lokomotiv Moscow beat Dinamo Tbilisi 2–0 in the Soviet Cup final. Goals were scored by Aleksei Sokolov and Viktor Lavrov. The Georgian side was coached by a foreign head coach out of France Jules Limbeck.

Soviet Union spring football championship

Group A

Group B

Group V

Group G

Top goalscorers

Group A
Mikhail Semichastny (Dinamo Moscow) – 6 goals

Group B
Boris Paichadze (Dinamo Tbilisi) – 7 goals

Soviet Union fall football championship

Group A

Group B

Group V

Group G

Republican level
Football competitions of union republics
 No republican-level round-robin competitions were conducted in Russian SFSR, Tajik SSR, Turkmen SSR
 No republican-level cup competitions were conducted in Russian SFSR, Tajik SSR, Uzbek SSR
 New union republics were established in 1936: Kazakh SSR and Kirgiz SSR
 Transcaucasian SFSR was dissolved into its three constituent republics

Football championships
 Ukrainian SSR – Ordzhonikidze Factory Kramatorsk (see 1936 Football Championship of the Ukrainian SSR)
 Belarusian SSR – city of Minsk (see Football Championship of the Belarusian SSR)
 Transcaucasian SFSR – unknown
 Uzbek SSR – city of Tashkent

Football cups
 Ukrainian SSR – FC Dynamo Kyiv (see 1936 Cup of the Ukrainian SSR)
 Belarusian SSR – FC Dinamo Minsk
 Transcaucasian SFSR – unknown
 Turkmen SSR – Lokomotiv Ashkhabad

References

External links
 1936 Soviet football championship. RSSSF